Ángel Pontarolo (born 27 September 1937) is an Argentine rower. He competed in the men's coxless four event at the 1960 Summer Olympics.

References

External links
 

1937 births
Living people
Argentine male rowers
Olympic rowers of Argentina
Rowers at the 1960 Summer Olympics
Sportspeople from Rosario, Santa Fe